Events from the year 1311 in the Kingdom of Scotland.

Incumbents
 Monarch – Robert I

Events
 August – King Robert the Bruce retaliates for Edward II's invasion the previous year by invading northern England.

Deaths
unknown date
 Baldred Bisset, lawyer who helped prepare the Scottish case for sovereignty in the face of English claims and aggression (born 1260)

See also

 Timeline of Scottish history

References

 
Years of the 14th century in Scotland
Wars of Scottish Independence